Elijah Crane (August 29, 1754-February 21, 1834) was a Canton, Massachusetts farmer, and inn keeper, who served as the first Town Clerk, and on the first Board of Selectmen of Canton, Massachusetts.  Crane was also the first representative to the Massachusetts House of Representatives from Canton, and the sheriff of Norfolk County, Massachusetts from May 16, 1810 to 1811 and from June 20, 1812 to 1834.

He was involved with the creation of the Dedham Bank.

Revolutionary War service
Crane served with his militia company during the Siege of Boston, at the fortification known as the Lamb's Den in the American Revolutionary War.

References

High Sheriffs of Norfolk County
American hoteliers
19th-century American people
1754 births
1834 deaths
People from Milton, Massachusetts
People from Canton, Massachusetts
18th-century American people
19th-century American politicians
Massachusetts militiamen in the American Revolution
Massachusetts Federalists
Members of the Massachusetts House of Representatives